Shari Robertson is an American film director and producer. Her filmmaking credits include Twelve Stories: How Democracy Works Now, Well-Founded Fear, These Girls Are Missing, Inside the Khmer Rouge, Return to Year Zero and Washington/Peru: We Ain't Winnin'. Her films have been featured on HBO, CNN, PBS, BBC, Channel 4, Human Rights Watch International Film Festival in London and New York City and The Sundance Film Festival among others.

Robertson’s career started with projects in the Southern Highlands rainforest of Papua New Guinea. Since then, her films have explored social and political stories in Cambodia and Thailand, Peru and Africa before concentrating on immigration reform and political asylum in the U.S. Robertson currently lives in New York City where she and her filmmaking partner, Michael Camerini, have a production company, The Epidavros Project, Inc.

Filmography

See also 

Michael Camerini
Well-Founded Fear
Twelve Stories: How Democracy Works Now

References

External links
 
 Shari Robertson at Epidavors
 How Democracy Works Now Bio
 Director's Statement for How Democracy Works Now
 About Shari at nytimes.com

Place of birth missing (living people)
Year of birth missing (living people)
American documentary film directors
Living people